Events from 2023 in the European Union.

Incumbents 

  President of the European Council
  Charles Michel
  Commission President
  Ursula von der Leyen
  Council Presidency
  Sweden (Jan – Jun)
  Spain (July – Dec)
  Parliament President
  Roberta Metsola
  High Representative
  Josep Borrell

Events

January 
 1 January – Croatia adopted the euro and became the 20th member state of the eurozone. They entered the Schengen area and became the 23th European union member to do so, and the 27th states to accede to the union overall 
 4 January – Internet privacy regulators in Ireland fine Meta Platforms €390 million for violations of the General Data Protection Regulation on Facebook and Instagram.

Predicted and scheduled events 
 28 October – A partial lunar eclipse will be visible in the evening and the next morning over Europe and most of Africa and Asia, and will be the 11th lunar eclipse of Lunar Saros 146.
 On or before 11 November – 2023 Polish parliamentary election for the Parliament of Poland.
 No later than 10 December – 2023 Spanish general election for the Cortes Generales.

See also

Overviews 

 European Union
 History of European Union
 Outline of European Union
 Politics of European Union
 Timeline of European Union history
 Years in European Union
 History of modern European Union
 Government of European Union

Related timelines for current period 

 2023
 2023 in Europe
 2023 in politics and government
 2020s

References 

 
Years of the 21st century in the European Union
2020s in the European Union